NA-55 Rawalpindi-IV is a constituency for the National Assembly of Pakistan.

Boundaries
The constituency was renamed to NA-61 Rawalpindi-V from NA-54, and was delimited to include all of Rawalpindi Cantonment and 3 census charges of Chaklala Cantonment. In the earlier delimitation, much of Chaklala was included in this constituency. Now what area has been shifted to the new NA-60 (old NA-56).

Members of Parliament

1977–2002: NA-40 Rawalpindi-V

2002–2018: NA-54 Rawalpindi-V

2018-2022: NA-61 Rawalpindi-V

Party Trends
Initially a bastion of the left-wing Pakistan Peoples Party (PPP) in the 1970 and 1977 elections, the constituency of Rawalpindi-V has seen a strong shift towards the conservative center-right parties since Zia's Islamist regime.

Candidates associated with Pakistan Muslim League (N) (formally IJI) have performed considerably well in the general elections from this constituency. Since the 1988 elections, the party's candidates have won the constituency 6 times out of 7 times, with left-wing PPP only making winning inroads in the 2002 elections. This includes the 1988–1997 unbeaten streak of Nisar Ali Khan, who has never lost in this constituency. However, since the constituency delimitation in 2002, Nisar's traditional votebank has shifted into the predominantly rural NA-52, where he continues to dominate. While the NA-54 has become a majorly urban constituency having votebanks for all major political parties.

However, since the reentering of the democratic socialist Pakistan Tehreek-e-Insaf into the fold of national politics in the 2013 elections, there has been a marked shift in the choices of the constituency's voters with the party becoming a second major force in the area after PML-N.

Voting Patterns 
The voting pattern in NA-54 shows a division of votes between two parties/candidates, with other candidates playing a minor role in the elections. In 2002, the top two contenders received 72% of the polls votes, with the winner securing the seat following a close competition with the runner-up. The winner's share increased sharply in 2008 when the top two contenders received 88% of the polled votes. According to the results, the winner secured the seat with a margin of 23.4% votes, showing a clear dominance in the elections. The polls in 2013 also witnessed a close race between the top two candidates who secured 87% of the polled votes. Historical data shows that the second runner-up's share has decreased consistently over the years, indicating a clear two-party race in the constituency. Given the consistent voting pattern, the next polls may witness a similar trend. However, the decrease in the winner's share and the close race in 2013 suggest that an alliance between the runners-up may yield different results in upcoming elections.

Detailed Results

Election 1988 

 

†As Pakistan Awami Ittehad.

Election 1990 

 

†As People's Democratic Alliance.

Election 1993 

 

† The Islami Jamhoori Ittehad was dissolved prior to the 1993 general elections, as JUI-F, JUI-S and JI parted ways from the alliance. Subsequently, the core of the party, Muslim league – Nawaz, contested elections for the first time as Pakistan Muslim League (N).

‡As Pakistan Islamic Front.

Election 1997 

 

†As Haq Parast Group.

Election 2002 

General elections were held on 10 Oct 2002. Zamurd Khan of PPP won by 31,491 votes.

Election 2008 

Malik Abrar Ahmad of Pakistan Muslim League (N) succeeded in the election 2008 and became the member of National Assembly. The 2008 elections also saw the lowest turnout in the history of this constituency – at just 38.5%.

 

†PML-Q's Allama Ayaz Zahir Hashmi competed in the 2002 elections and got 1,640 votes.

Election 2013 

General elections were held on 11 May 2013. A total of 166,523 votes were cast of which 165,049 were deemed valid. The overall turnout of the constituency was 55.36%. Malik Abrar Ahmed of PML-N won by 7,649 votes and became the  member of National Assembly.

Election 2018 

 
 
 

†JI contested as part of MMA.

By-election 2023 
A by-election will be held on 19 March 2023 due to the resignation of Aamir Mehmood Kiani, the previous MNA from this seat.

See also
 NA-54 Rawalpindi-III
 NA-56 Rawalpindi-V

References

External links 
Election result's official website
Delimitation 2018 official website Election Commission of Pakistan

61
61